Nurullah is a masculine given name of Arabic origin, meaning light of God of Muslim origin. It is derived from the Arabi word nur, meaning light, and Allah, meaning God. It may also be romanized as Noorullah, Norullah, or Nourullah.

People named Nurullah include:
Qazi Nurullah Shustari (1542–1610/11), Persian jurist (faqih) and scholar
M. Nurullah Tuncer (born 1959), Turkish theatre director
Nurullah Genç (born 1960), Turkish poet and novelist
Nurullah Tevfik Ağansoy (1960–1996), Turkish mob boss
Nurullah Sağlam (born 1966), Turkish football coach
Noorullah (cricketer), Afghan cricketer
, Iranian Cleric

Places 
Nurollah Beyglu, village in Iran
Nurulla Mosque, in Kazan, Russia

See Also
 List of Arabic theophoric names

Turkish masculine given names
Arabic masculine given names